Iehira (written: 家平 or 家衡) is a masculine Japanese given name. Notable people with the name include:

, Japanese samurai
, Japanese kugyō

Japanese masculine given names